Dasycorsa is a genus of moths in the family Geometridae.

Species
 Dasycorsa modesta (Staudinger, 1879)

References
 Dasycorsa at Markku Savela's Lepidoptera and Some Other Life Forms
 Natural History Museum Lepidoptera genus database

Ennominae